Ginty is an Irish surname and, less commonly, a given name that may refer to:

Surname
 David Ginty (born 1962), American neuroscientist and developmental biologist
 James Francis Ginty (born 1980), American actor
 Robert Ginty (born 1948), American movie actor, producer, scenarist, and director
 Rory Ginty (born 1977), Irish football midfielder

Given name
 Ginty Vrede (1985 – 2008), professional Dutch kickboxer, and 2008 WBC Heavyweight Muay Thai World champion

Other uses
 Ginty, the Stone Giant, a character from the 2011 video game Dota 2.

See also
 McGinty, surname

Surnames